Richard Holden (born 2 December 1974) is an Australian economist and Professor of Economics at the University of New South Wales. He was previously a faculty member at the University of Chicago and the Massachusetts Institute of Technology.

Early life and education
Holden was born in Sydney, Australia and received his undergraduate degree from the University of Sydney, where he was awarded the university medal in economics. He received an A.M and Ph.D from Harvard University.

Career
Holden is professor of economics at UNSW Business School, President of the Academy of the Social Sciences in Australia, and is currently editor of the Journal of Law and Economics and is formerly an Australian Research Council Future Fellow. He is a fellow of the Econometric Society and a fellow of the Academy of Social Sciences in Australia. Holden's research, which mainly is centralized around topics including organizational, political, and law economics have garnered attention from prominent newspapers including: The New York Times, The Economist, and others. He has over 40 publications and 15 working papers/papers under review. Prior to his heavy involvement in the world of academia, Holden worked as an associate and senior consultant at Bain & Company (1997–1998) followed by time as an analyst, then as Vice President for Pacific Equity Partners (1998–2001).

Affiliation with Blueprint Institute 
Upon its launch in mid-2020, Holden was appointed to the Strategic Council of the Blueprint Institute, an online think tank associated with moderate members of the Liberal Party.

The Blueprint Institute provides no transparency with respect to the identity of its financial backers. However, given that the Blueprint Institute was co-founded by Ian Hancock, the managing director of lobbying firms PremierNational and PremierState, and Lachlan Crombie, the Director of Government Relations at both firms, there has been speculation the organization is funded by the lobbyists as a front for the financial interests of their clients, particularly those in the renewable industry sector. Michael Photios, chairman, founder and owner of PremierNational and PremierState, sits on the Strategic Council of the Blueprint Institute alongside Holden.

Holden resigned from the Blueprint Institute's Strategic Council along with economists Gordon Leslie and Emilia Tjernstrom after being asked to endorse using $350,000 in donated funds to conduct polling in marginal and regional electorates on attitudes to climate change ahead of the upcoming federal election. The revelations around the proposed use of donor funds for clearly political and lobbying purposes also led to the resignations of the Blueprint Institute's Chief Economist, Steven Hamilton, and Director of Research, Daniel D'Hotman. Hamilton noted in a now deleted social media post that they believed the proposal "had the potential to undermine the integrity of Blueprint’s research, so felt our positions had become untenable.” In the months preceding these resignations, six members of the Blueprint Institute's Strategic Council ended their affiliation with the organisation.

References

Harvard Graduate School of Arts and Sciences alumni
Living people
People from Sydney
University of Sydney alumni
1974 births
Fellows of the Econometric Society
21st-century Australian economists
Fellows of the Academy of the Social Sciences in Australia